Karnal Division is one of the six divisions of Haryana, a state of India. It comprises the districts of Karnal, Panipat and Kaithal. It was announced in January 2017 and approved by the Haryana cabinet on 2 February 2017.

See also
 Districts of Haryana
 Divisions of Haryana
 Faridabad division
 Railway in Haryana

References

External links
 Karnal range police
 Karnal website

Karnal district